Schneider Crossroads is an unincorporated community in Fairfax County, in the U.S. state of Virginia. State Route 620 and State Route 609 cross here and it is located 5.3 miles northwest by road from Centreville. It contains little more than a florists' and a site called Cox Farms.  
Pleasant Valley Golf Club lies to the northeast, with the two other quadrants also incorporated into yet undeveloped Fairfax County Park Authority parks. As the crossroads is a major traffic bottleneck, with traffic flow formally managed by 4-way stop signs, Loudoun County, just west of the crossroads, offered over a million of the county's funds in 2012 to pay for the intersection upgrade as their residents were inconvenienced the most by the traffic problem, although the intersection is completely in Fairfax County. The Virginia Department of Transportation determined that the optimal solution was a roundabout which was built from 2015 to 2016. 
Although traffic is much improved, the poor nature of the two-lane Braddock Road to the east of the traffic circle is now the main impediment of east-bound morning traffic.

References

Unincorporated communities in Virginia
Unincorporated communities in Fairfax County, Virginia
Washington metropolitan area